KLCC District Cooling is a building that is used to provide district cooling for the KLCC vicinity. It is a 30,000 ton gas-powered turbine-driven chilled water unit providing cool air not only to Petronas Twin Towers and Suria KLCC, but also to Maxis Tower, Menara Exxon Mobil, Kuala Lumpur Convention Centre, and Mandarin Oriental Kuala Lumpur as well as As Syakirin Mosque.

The building is situated behind As Syakirin Mosque.

Transportation
The building is accessible within walking distance from KLCC LRT Station.

References

Buildings and structures in Kuala Lumpur